Cactus Springs is the name for two communities in Nevada.

Cactus Springs, Clark County, Nevada
Cactus Springs, Nye County, Nevada